Khalilullah II was the 41st Shirvanshah, governing Shirvan under Safavid suzerainty between 1524—1535.

Reign 
Born as Khalil, after the death of his father, he assumed the regnal name of Khalilullah II in 1524. He was married to Ismail I's daughter, and Tahmasp I's sister Pari Khan Khanum (not to be mistaken for Tahmasp's daughter Pari Khan Khanum) on 4 October 1521.

Relations with Safavids 
After death of Ismail I, the new shah Tahmasp I was suspicious towards the new shirvanshah. This suspicion had grown when the latter gave asylum to a traitor to the Safavids - Gilan ruler Sultan Muzaffar. However, before demanding a pardon, Khalilullah died unexpectedly without issue, and was succeeded by Farrukh Yassar II.

References

1535 deaths
Year of birth unknown
16th-century Iranian people
Safavid governors of Shirvan
16th-century people of Safavid Iran